The Trade and Tariff Act of 1984 (P.L. 98-573) clarified the conditions under which unfair trade cases under Section 301 of the Trade Act of 1974 (P.L. 93-618) can be pursued. It also provided bilateral trade negotiating authority for the U.S.-Israel Free Trade Agreement and the U.S.-Canada Free Trade Agreement, and set out procedures to be followed for congressional approval of future bilateral trade agreements.

The bill was sponsored by Democrat Sam Gibbons (FL-7) and was signed into law by President Ronald Reagan on October 30, 1984.

Congressional gatekeeping 
A key feature of the legislation was its modification of the 1974 Trade Act's Fast track authority, incorporating a "committee gatekeeping" device.  Congress opted to adapt the fast-track procedure to possible bilateral free-trade agreements with nations other than Israel.  Going forward, the procedure provided that if a country other than Israel requested free-trade negotiations with the United States, the President would be required to notify two "gatekeeper" committees – the House Ways and Means and the Senate Finance committees – and to consult with those committees for a period of 60 legislative days before giving the statutorily required 90-day notice of his intent to sign an agreement.  If neither committee disapproved of the negotiations during this 60-day committee consultation period, any subsequently negotiated agreement would receive fast-track legislative consideration.  The 1984 Act thus greatly increased the influence of Congress in negotiating trade agreements.  For example, the 60-day pre-negotiation consultation period with the two committees secured their involvement in the Canada-United States Free Trade Agreement negotiations months before formal talks began, allowing Congress to extract concessions from the President as a condition of letting negotiations proceed.

References 

United States federal trade legislation
1984 in the United States